Chad P. Franks is a retired United States Air Force major general who last served as the commander of the Fifteenth Air Force. Previously, he was the deputy commander for operations and intelligence of the Combined Joint Task Force – Operation Inherent Resolve.

References

External links

Year of birth missing (living people)
Living people
Place of birth missing (living people)
United States Air Force generals